Visa requirements for Tajik citizens are administrative entry restrictions by the authorities of other states placed on citizens of Tajikistan. As of 2 July 2019, Tajik citizens had visa-free or visa on arrival access to 57 countries and territories, ranking the Tajik passport 87th in terms of travel freedom (tied with a passport from Burkina Faso) according to the Henley Passport Index.


Visa requirements map

Visa requirements

See also 

 Visa policy of Tajikistan
Tajik passport

References and Notes
References

Notes

Tajik
Foreign relations of Tajikistan